Forever to Remain is a 1948 novel by E. V. Timms, the first in his Great South Land Saga series of novels. He wrote it intending to be the first in a 12-part series of novels. It is set in West Australia, where Timms had spent some of his childhood.

The initial print run was 20,000 copies, which was considered "colossal" in Australian publishing at the time.

It was published in Britain as The Violent Years.

Plot
In 1831, a ship London Lass sails from London to Swan River settlement in Western Australia.

Adaptations
Timms adapted the novel for radio in 1952.

References

External links
Forever to Remain at AustLit

1948 Australian novels
Novels set in Western Australia
Angus & Robertson books